Anara is a village in Kathlal taluka, Kheda district, Gujarat, India. The population was 8,403 at the 2011 Indian census.

References

Villages in Kheda district